Mordellistena aritai is a beetle in the genus Mordellistena of the family Mordellidae. It was described in 1964 by Nomura.

References

aritai
Beetles described in 1964